Christopher Merrick Hughes (born 3 March 1954, London, England), also known as Merrick, is a British music producer,  songwriter, and drummer for Adam and the Ants. Best known as producer of Tears for Fears' Songs from the Big Chair, and as the co-writer of "Everybody Wants to Rule the World", Hughes has a joint background as a musician, songwriter and producer. His career began with Adam and The Ants as drummer and producer of the "Cartrouble" and "Kings of the Wild Frontier" singles, then the Kings of the Wild Frontier album. Yielding three hit singles, the album earned Hughes Music Weeks 'Producer of the Year Award'.

Life and career
Hughes was educated at Emanuel School in London, and was a member of Adam and the Ants, also producing their albums, Kings of the Wild Frontier and Prince Charming. Hughes was awarded Music Week’s "Producer of the Year" award for his work on the album, Kings of the Wild Frontier. He co-wrote Tears for Fears' hit song "Everybody Wants to Rule the World", and produced their first two albums, the platinum-selling The Hurting and the multi-platinum Songs from the Big Chair. He began working with the band again on their third album, The Seeds of Love, but left the project due to creative differences. Hughes also produced The Electric Soft Parade's debut album, Holes in the Wall, which was nominated for the Mercury Prize, and Propaganda's 1234. Hughes was also a member of Dalek I Love You and co-produced Peter Gabriel's "Red Rain".

In February 1994, Hughes released Shift, his first solo album, which was re-released in July 2008. Shift was a tribute to American minimalist composer, Steve Reich. In 1972, Hughes' father took him to London to see Reich's performance of Drumming. Hughes credits Reich as a driving influence in his career. Shift uses fragments of Reich's work and "subjects it to subtle manipulations using the technology of recorded sound".

At db records, Hughes worked on the early development of Tom McRae and The Electric Soft Parade, producing debut albums that were both nominated for a Mercury Music Prize.

Hughes has worked with many artists including: Adam and the Ants, Def Leppard, Tears for Fears, Robert Plant, Paul McCartney, Peter Gabriel, Ric Ocasek, Wang Chung, Tom McRae, The Electric Soft Parade, Propaganda, Howard Jones, Lloyd Cole, Jon Bon Jovi, Tori Amos, Enya (Eithne Ní Bhraonáin), Moya Brennan (Máire Ní Bhraonáin) the voice of Clannad, Crybaby, Stackridge and Sam Brookes.

His latest album, Eirenic Life was released on Helium Records on 14 July 2017.

References

External links
Official website
website

Living people
Adam and the Ants members
English rock drummers
British male drummers
English record producers
English songwriters
English new wave musicians
Musicians from London
New wave drummers
1954 births
People educated at Emanuel School